Andrea Demirović (born 17 June 1985), also known as simply Andrea, is a Montenegrin singer and a student of the Cetinje Music Academy – Music Pedagogy.

Demirović was born in Podgorica, Montenegro (then part of SFR Yugoslavia). Her breakthrough came at the Sunčane Skale festival in 2002. She then had considerable successes at regional festivals, including the Serbo-Montenegrin and Montenegrin national finals for selecting the Eurovision Song Contest entry. Her first album, titled "Andrea", was released in 2006, under the City Records label. Her follow-up album is due for release later in 2009, and the first single from the new album is "The Queen of the Night", a cover of Mirela's Misión Eurovisión 2007 song.

In 2015, she took part in Odbrojavanje za Beč (Countdown to Vienna), the Serbian national final for the Eurovision Song Contest 2015 but did not win. The same year, she announced the Montenegrin votes at the contest.

Eurovision 2009 
On 23 January 2009 it was revealed that Andrea would represent Montenegro at the Eurovision Song Contest 2009 in Moscow, Russia. She was the first female singer to represent the nation at the contest and performed the song Just Get Out of My Life. It was the opening song in the first semi-final on 12 May, however it failed to win a place in the final.

Other works 
In 2021, Andrea made a duet with Bojan Jovović in ballad the Spring.

External links 
 https://web.archive.org/web/20090206121826/http://www.limark.net/html/index.php?categoryid=3&langid=1
 Video for The Queen of the Night
 Video for Oblak od Ljubavi
 Video for Nisi ti Kriv

1985 births
Living people
Musicians from Podgorica
21st-century Montenegrin women singers
Eurovision Song Contest entrants for Montenegro
Eurovision Song Contest entrants of 2009